The 1999 Copa Colsanitas singles was the singles event of the second edition of the Copa Colsanitas; a WTA Tier IV tournament and the most prestigious women's tennis tournament held in Colombia and Hispanic America. Paola Suárez was the defending champion but lost in the semifinals to Christína Papadáki.

Fabiola Zuluaga won in the final 6–1, 6–3 against Papadáki.

Seeds

Draw

Finals

Top half

Bottom half

Qualifying

Seeds

Qualifiers

Lucky losers
  Alice Canepa

Qualifying draw

First qualifier

Second qualifier

Third qualifier

Fourth qualifier

External links
 1999 Copa Colsanitas Draw

Copa Colsanitas
Copa Colsanitas